Tirosh (lit. Grape juice) is a moshav in central Israel. Located between Beit Shemesh and Kiryat Malakhi, it falls under the jurisdiction of Mateh Yehuda Regional Council.

History
The village was established in 1955 by Jewish immigrants and refugees from North Africa on land that had belonged to the depopulated  Palestinian village of 'Ajjur.

Its name is derived from the fact that there are many vineyards in the area.

Just outside the village is the reported location of a storage facility for nuclear weapons.

References

Moshavim
Populated places established in 1955
Israeli nuclear development
Populated places in Jerusalem District
1955 establishments in Israel
North African-Jewish culture in Israel